Take a Bite is the seventh studio album by British heavy metal band, Girlschool, released by GWR Records in 1988. It is the first album to feature Tracey Lamb on bass, replacing Gil Weston-Jones.

Overview
Take a Bite was recorded at a very low time for Girlschool because, despite the very good reviews for the previous album Nightmare at Maple Cross, they had not succeeded in regaining the fan base support in the UK which they had in the early 80s and they could not improve the sales of their album worldwide for the lack of a US release. The band had hoped to record the new album with their long-time producer Vic Maile, who was not available because of his illness. The album was instead produced by Monty Python's collaborator André Jacquemin at Redwood Studios, which are co-owned by Jacquemin and actor Michael Palin, member of the British comedy group Monty Python. The same studios had been utilised by Motörhead to record their album Rock 'n' Roll the year before. The recording and mixing sessions took a very long time because, to save money, they were scheduled on 'dead time' in the middle of the night, when the studio was empty.
On the contrary, the artwork, photos and packaging are the result of a rushed work done in less than a week. "We got to the situation where we needed photographs of the band and all we had were these snaps taken by the fans" remarked guitarist Cris Bonacci in an interview to Kerrang! magazine about the unsatisfying results of the album packaging.

The very good reviews and their UK tour with Gary Glitter did not help the album to chart at home and after an American and European tour GWR did not renew their contract. By the end of 1989, Girlschool had practically disbanded.

The song "Head over Heels" contains a text written by Motörhead bassist Lemmy on a napkin, during a night out in a pub with McAuliffe and other friends.
The album contains also the cover of Sweet's single "Fox on the Run", taken from the album Desolation Boulevard of 1974. Enigma Records, which produced the album in America, released two promo singles for the songs "Head over Heels" and "Fox on the Run" to be distributed to radio stations in the USA. Roadrunner Records marketed the album in Europe.

Track listing

Personnel
Band members
Kim McAuliffe – vocals, rhythm guitar
Cris Bonacci – lead guitar
Tracey Lamb – bass
Denise Dufort – drums

Additional musicians
Merv Goldsworthy, Pete Jupp (FM) – backing vocals on "Girls on Top"
Enid Williams – backing vocals on "This Time"

Release history

References

External links
Official Girlschool discography
"Fox on the Run" video clip

1988 albums
Girlschool albums